The 1976 USA Outdoor Track and Field Championships took place between June 10–12 at Drake Stadium on the campus of University of California, Los Angeles in Westwood, California. The decathlon took place on June 25–26 at Hayward Field in Eugene, Oregon as part of the 1976 Olympic Trials where Bruce Jenner improved his own world record. This meet was organized by the AAU. It was the first such meet, a precedent that has been followed subsequently, where the women's division competed  at the same venue concurrently with the men.

Results

Men track events

Men field events

Women track events

Women field events

See also
United States Olympic Trials (track and field)

References

 Results from T&FN
 results

USA Outdoor Track and Field Championships
Usa Outdoor Track And Field Championships, 1976
Track and field
Track and field in California
Outdoor Track and Field Championships
Outdoor Track and Field Championships
Sports competitions in California